Maryland state elections in 2020 were held on Tuesday, November 3, 2020. Its primaries were held on June 2, 2020. 

In addition to the U.S. presidential race, Maryland voters elected all of its seats to the House of Representatives and 3 of 7 seats on the Maryland Court of Appeals. It also voted on two ballot measures.

Federal offices

President of the United States

Maryland had 10 electoral votes in the Electoral College. Democrat Joe Biden won all of them with 65% of the popular vote.

United States House of Representatives

There were 7 U.S. Representatives in Maryland that were up for election in addition to 1 open seat. 7 Democrats and 1 Republican were returned. No seats changed hands.

State judiciary
All three incumbents whose seats were up for reelection ran again.

Ballot measures

Question 1

Question 2
Question 2 would allow the State Lottery and Gaming Control Commission to issue sports betting licenses.

Polling
On Question 2

On whether gambling should be expanded to allow sports betting online in Maryland

On whether gambling should be expanded to allow sports betting online in Maryland

Notes

References

Further reading

External links
 
 
  (State affiliate of the U.S. League of Women Voters)
 

 
Maryland